The Battle of Festubert (15–25 May 1915) was an attack by the British army in the Artois region of France on the western front during World War I. The offensive formed part of a series of attacks by the French Tenth Army and the British First Army in the Second Battle of Artois . After the failure of the breakthrough attempt by the First Army in the attack at Aubers Ridge (9 May 1915) tactics of a short hurricane bombardment and an infantry advance with unlimited objectives, were replaced by the French practice of slow and deliberate artillery-fire intended to prepare the way for an infantry attack.

A continuous three-day bombardment by the British heavy artillery was planned, to cut wire and demolish German machine-gun posts and infantry strong points. The objectives were  forward, rather than the  depth of advance attempted at Aubers Ridge. The battle was the first British attempt at attrition.

Background

Tactical developments
The Battle of Festubert was the continuation of the Battle of Aubers Ridge (9 May) and part of the larger French Second Battle of Artois. The resumption of the British offensive was intended to assist the French Tenth Army offensive against Vimy Ridge near Arras, by attracting German divisions to the British front, rather than reinforcing the defenders opposite the French.

Prelude

British plan
The attack was made by the British First Army (General Sir Douglas Haig) against a salient in the German lines between Neuve Chapelle to the north and the village of Festubert to the south. The assault was planned along a  front and would initially be made by Indian and British troops of the Gharwal Brigade, 7th (Meerut) Division together with the 5th and 6th Infantry Brigades of the 2nd Division.

Battle
The battle was preceded by a  bombardment by  that fired about  This bombardment failed to significantly damage the front line defences of the German 6th Army and the initial advance only made progress on the 6th Brigade front in good weather conditions. Progress was again limited with casualties very high; on 17 May the 4th Guards Brigade of the 2nd Division relieved elements of 7th Division but made minor advances only. By 19 May, the 2nd Division and 7th Division had to be withdrawn due to their casualties with the main objectives of 15 May still in German hands. On 18 May, the 1st Canadian Division, assisted by the 51st (Highland) Division, attacked but made little progress in the face of German artillery-fire. The British dug in at the new front line in heavy rain. The Germans brought up reinforcements and strengthened their defences. From  the attack was resumed but again made little progress. The offensive had resulted in a  advance.

Aftermath

Casualties
The British lost  from 15/16 to 25 May; the 2nd Division lost  the 7th Division  47th Division had  the Canadian Division lost  and the 7th (Meerut) Division had  The German defenders had  including  taken prisoner.

Commemoration

The 100th anniversary of the battle saw a range of commemorations held across the world. Some of the most poignant were those held in the Highlands of Scotland, in particular in shinty playing communities, which were affected disproportionately by losses in the battle. Skye Camanachd and Kingussie Camanachd, representing two areas which lost a great many men, were joined by the British Forces shinty team, SCOTS Camanachd for a weekend of commemorations, lectures, memorial services and shinty matches on the weekend of 15–17 May 2015 in Portree. Isle of Skye. A week later, the Beauly Shinty Club renamed their pavilion after the Paterson brothers, Donald and Alasdair, who were killed in the battle and were part of their 1913 Camanachd Cup winning side. Donald's bagpipes were recovered with his other effects in the early 1980s and were played at both commemorations.

See also

 List of Canadian battles during World War I

Footnotes

References

Further reading

External links
 British Order of Battle, Aubers Ridge and Festubert
 The Battle of Festubert on www.firstworldwar.com
 Festubert
 Battle of Festubert, 15–27 May 1915 on www.historyofwar.org

Festubert
Festubert
Festubert
Festubert
Festubert
Conflicts in 1915
1915 in France
Battle honours of the King's Royal Rifle Corps
May 1915 events